Amentü Gemisi Nasıl Yürüdü is a 1969 Turkish animated short film directed by Tonguç Yaşar.

Awards 
 1970 International Adana Golden Boll Film Festival, Best Short
 1973 Annecy International Animated Film Festival, Short films out of competition

References

External links
 The film on YouTube

1960s animated short films
Turkish animated films
Turkish short films
Turkish animated short films